Nai Hui-fang (born 26 February 1969) is a Taiwanese former athlete specializing in long jump and triple jump events.

Career 
Nai holds the Taiwanese long jump (8.34m) and triple jump (16.65m) records. Nai competed in the triple jump at the 1996 Summer Olympics in Atlanta, Georgia, where he placed 17th in the qualifying round with a mark of 7.91m, and did not qualify for the final.

References

Taiwanese male long jumpers
Athletes (track and field) at the 1988 Summer Olympics
Athletes (track and field) at the 1996 Summer Olympics
Olympic athletes of Taiwan
1969 births
Living people
Athletes (track and field) at the 1994 Asian Games
Asian Games competitors for Chinese Taipei